The 1935 French Grand Prix (formally the XXIX Grand Prix de l'Automobile Club de France) was a Grand Prix motor race which was held at Montlhéry, France on 23 June 1935. The race lasted 500 km (12.5 km x 40 laps) and was won by Rudolf Caracciola driving a Mercedes-Benz.

Background
For the first time, the Automobile Club of France decided that the grid positions should be set by practice times, rather than by ballot, a practice introduced in Europe at the Monaco Grand Prix.

Having witnessed the more powerful German cars winning nearly every race they entered (notably not the 1934 French Grand Prix), the organisers decided to reduce the speeds of the Montlhéry circuit by installing three slow chicanes. This was ultimately successful in ensuring the competitiveness of the Alfa Romeos, with Tazio Nuvolari able to set second fastest time in practice, and completing the fastest lap of the race, albeit 23 seconds slower than last year's fastest lap due to the chicanes.

Starting Grid (3x2)

Classification

Fastest Lap: Tazio Nuvolari (Alfa Romeo Tipo-B P3) 5:29.1, 136.74 km/h

References

External links

French Grand Prix
French Grand Prix
Grand Prix